Belle Teal is a novel written by Ann M. Martin in 2001.

Plot summary
The novel tells the story of Belle Teal Harper, her mother Adele, her grandmother Belle Teal Rhodes, and their friends and community. Belle Teal is now going into 5th grade, and this year is very special. She is going to have the best teacher ever! (The one she's been hoping to get forever.) And her best friends are in her class. Also, a few new kids are coming to her school, some kids who are different than her, they are black kids, but not so much. There is one new black kid in her class. Even though she is white, she becomes great friends with one of them, Darryl,  and introduces him to her best friend Clarice, also white.

The book deals with  many difficult aspects of growing up; Belle Teal encounters racism, death, abuse, bullying, and other harsh realities of adulthood.  She also begins to learn that not all adults are saints and that one cannot always depend on them, regardless of how desperate or alone you are.  However, Belle Teal proves to be a strong, powerful young woman, with a deep sense of right and wrong and the guts to fight for what she believes in. Her story is woven with the love and support of friends and family; it illustrates the bonds between us and encourages us to be courageous and heartfelt and earnest and true—and to make the best of what we are given. She is taught to stand up for herself and others.

References

2001 American novels
American children's novels
American bildungsromans
2001 children's books